Brian Scott "Scotty" Hopson (born August 8, 1989) is an American professional basketball player for the Oklahoma City Blue of the NBA G League. He played college basketball for the Tennessee Volunteers before playing professionally in Greece, Israel, Turkey, Spain, China, Croatia, New Zealand and Australia. He has also played in the NBA G League and had short stints in the NBA with the Cleveland Cavaliers (2014), Dallas Mavericks (2018) and Oklahoma City Thunder (2021–22).

High school and college career
Considered a five-star recruit by the Rivals.com recruiting network, Hopson was listed as the No. 2 shooting guard and the No. 5 player in the nation in 2008. He played three seasons of college basketball for the University of Tennessee under head coach Bruce Pearl from 2008 to 2011.

Professional career

Kolossos Rodou (2011–2012) 
Hopson went undrafted in the 2011 NBA draft. In August 2011, he signed with Kolossos Rodou of the Greek Basket League for the 2011–12 season.

Hapoel Eliat (2012–2013) 
In July 2012, Hopson signed with Hapoel Eilat of the Israeli Basketball Super League for the 2012–13 season. In 33 games, he averaged 17.7 points and 5.2 rebounds per game.

Anadolu Efes (2013–2014) 
In July 2013, Hopson signed with Anadolu Efes of the Turkish Basketball League for the 2013–14 season. His final game for Anadolu Efes came on January 13, 2014.

Cleveland Cavaliers (2014) 
On March 31, 2014, Hopson signed with the Cleveland Cavaliers. He had two assignments with the Canton Charge of the NBA Development League during April 2014.

On July 12, 2014, Hopson was traded, along with cash considerations, to the Charlotte Hornets in exchange for Brendan Haywood and the draft rights to Dwight Powell. The next day, the Hornets traded him to the New Orleans Pelicans in exchange for cash considerations. Two days later, he was traded again, this time to the Houston Rockets. On September 17, 2014, he was traded, along with Alonzo Gee, to the Sacramento Kings in exchange for Jason Terry and two future second-round draft picks. On September 24, 2014, he was waived by the Kings.

Sioux Falls Skyforce (2014–2015) 
On December 7, 2014, Hopson was acquired by the Sioux Falls Skyforce of the NBA Development League. On February 24, 2015, Hopson set two Skyforce single-game records, scoring 52 points and making 21 field goals in a win over the Reno Bighorns.

Laboral Kutxa (2015) 
On April 21, 2015, Hopson signed with Laboral Kutxa of Spain for the rest of the 2014–15 ACB season.

Foshan Long Lions (2015) 
In September 2015, Hopson signed with the Foshan Long Lions of China for the 2015–16 CBA season. He played seven games for Foshan in November 2015, before leaving the team.

Cedevita (2016–2017) 
On July 24, 2016, Hopson signed with Croatian club Cedevita Zagreb.

Ironi Nahariya (2017) 
On February 11, 2017, Hopson signed with Israeli club Ironi Nahariya for the rest of the 2016–17 season.

Galatasaray (2017–2018) 
On July 20, 2017, Hopson signed with Turkish club Galatasaray for the 2017–18 season. He left Galatasaray in January 2018.

Dallas Mavericks (2018) 
On February 26, 2018, Hopson signed a 10-day contract with the Dallas Mavericks. After appearing in one game, he was not offered a second 10-day contract.

Oklahoma City Blue (2018–2019) 
On October 10, 2018, Hopson signed with the Oklahoma City Thunder. He was waived two days later and subsequently joined the Thunder's NBA G League affiliate, the Oklahoma City Blue. On February 14, 2019, he signed a 10-day contract with the Thunder. He did not appear in a game for the Thunder during his stint and returned to the Blue after the contract expired.

Hapoel Holon (2019) 
On April 18, 2019, Hopson returned to Israel for a third stint, signing with Hapoel Holon. He suffered a foot injury in his first game with Holon and was later ruled out for the rest of the season.

New Zealand Breakers (2019–2020) 
On July 31, 2019, Hopson signed with the New Zealand Breakers for the 2019–20 NBL season. Early in the season, he split a ligament in his knee. He returned to action in December after missing most of November. He was named to the All-NBL Second Team.

Return to the Blue (2020) 
In February 2020, Hopson re-joined the Oklahoma City Blue of the NBA G League.

Melbourne United (2020–2021) 
On November 30, 2020, Hopson signed with Melbourne United for the 2020–21 NBL season. He helped Melbourne win the NBL championship in June 2021.

Oklahoma City Thunder / Third stint with the Blue (2021–2022) 
On October 14, 2021, Hopson signed an Exhibit 10 deal with the Oklahoma City Thunder. He was waived a day later and was acquired by the Oklahoma City Blue on October 26. On December 27, 2021, he signed a 10-day contract with the Thunder. He re-joined the Blue on January 6.

Dynamo Lebanon (2022) 
On April 15, 2022, Hopson signed with Dynamo Lebanon of the Lebanese Basketball League.

Fourth stint with the Blue (2022–present)
On November 3, 2022, Hopson was named to the opening night roster for the Oklahoma City Blue.

Career statistics

NBA

Regular season

|-
| align="left" | 
| align="left" | Cleveland
| 2 || 0 || 3.5 || .000 || .000 || .500 || .0 || .5 || .5 || .0 || .5
|-
| align="left" | 
| align="left" | Dallas
| 1 || 0 || 8.0 || .000 || – || .500 || .0 || 1.0 || .0 || .0 || 1.0
|-
| align="left" | 
| align="left" | Oklahoma City
| 1 || 0 || 18.0 || .500 || .000 || – || 1.0 || 1.0 || .0 || .0 || 4.0
|- class="sortbottom"
| style="text-align:center;" colspan="2" | Career
| 4 || 0 || 8.3 || .222 || .000 || .500 || .3 || .8 || .3 || .0 || 1.5

EuroLeague

|-
| style="text-align:left;"| 2013–14
| style="text-align:left;"| Anadolu Efes
| 11 || 10 || 28.5 || .625 || .484 || .735 || 4.2 || 1.1 || 1.1 || .5 || 15.5 || 15.7
|- class="sortbottom"
| style="text-align:center;" colspan="2" | Career
| 11 || 10 || 28.5 || .625 || .484 || .735 || 4.2 || 1.1 || 1.1 || .5 || 15.5 || 15.7

References

External links
Israeli League profile
FIBA profile
EuroLeague profile
Tennessee Colunteers bio

"Scotty Hopson: Always Learning" at nbl.com.au

1989 births
Living people
20th-century African-American people
21st-century African-American sportspeople
African-American basketball players
American expatriate basketball people in Australia
American expatriate basketball people in China
American expatriate basketball people in Croatia
American expatriate basketball people in Greece
American expatriate basketball people in Israel
American expatriate basketball people in Lebanon
American expatriate basketball people in New Zealand
American expatriate basketball people in Spain
American expatriate basketball people in Turkey
American men's basketball players
Anadolu Efes S.K. players
Basketball players from Kentucky
Canton Charge players
Cleveland Cavaliers players
Dallas Mavericks players
Galatasaray S.K. (men's basketball) players
Guangzhou Loong Lions players
Hapoel Eilat basketball players
Hapoel Holon players
Ironi Nahariya players
KK Cedevita players
Kolossos Rodou B.C. players
Liga ACB players
McDonald's High School All-Americans
Melbourne United players
New Zealand Breakers players
Oklahoma City Blue players
Oklahoma City Thunder players
Parade High School All-Americans (boys' basketball)
Saski Baskonia players
Shooting guards
Sioux Falls Skyforce players
Small forwards
Sportspeople from Hopkinsville, Kentucky
Tennessee Volunteers basketball players
Undrafted National Basketball Association players
United States men's national basketball team players